The Marshall–Rucker–Smith House is a historic home located at Charlottesville, Virginia. It was built for J. William and Carrie Marshall in 1894 by William T. Vandegrift, the grandfather of General Alexander Archer Vandegrift, and is a two-story, nearly square, Queen Anne style brick dwelling. It has a three-story octagonal corner tower, a prominent front gable projection of the slate-shingled hip roof, a two-story rear wing, and multiple one-story porches. A two-story solarium and library wing were added by its second owner, William J. Rucker in about 1930.  Also on the property is a contributing swimming pool (c. 1930) which is now used as a members-only neighborhood pool.  In the mid-20th century, after the house had been made into a rooming house, future Supreme Court Justice Sandra Day O'Connor numbered among its residents while her husband was attending the Judge Advocate General School at the University of Virginia School of Law.

It was listed on the National Register of Historic Places in 1999.  It is located in the Charlottesville and Albemarle County Courthouse Historic District.

References

Houses on the National Register of Historic Places in Virginia
Queen Anne architecture in Virginia
Houses completed in 1894
Houses in Charlottesville, Virginia
National Register of Historic Places in Charlottesville, Virginia
Individually listed contributing properties to historic districts on the National Register in Virginia